Lewis R. French is a gaff-rigged topsail schooner sailing out of Camden, Maine as a "Maine windjammer" offering weeklong cruises to tourists.  Built in 1871, she is the oldest known two-masted schooner in the United States, and one of a small number of this once-common form of vessel in active service.  The ship was designated a US National Historic Landmark in 1992.

Description and history
Lewis R. French was launched in 1871 in Christmas Cove in the town of South Bristol, Maine. The ship is 101 ft long, has  of deck, a  beam, and draws  with a full keel.  Sail is her only means of power.  Her frame is of double-sawn oak and hackmatack and her planking is white oak.  Fastenings were originally treenails, but were replaced during restoration by spiking.

According to the current owners' website and to researcher and author Virginia L. Thorndike, the schooner was built by the sons of Maine storekeeper Lewis R. French and named for their father.  In Thorndike's book Windjammer Watching on the Coast of Maine, the author writes that the three sons had an agreement with their father that he would finance the building of the vessel, and yet he never did.  They then retaliated, in a way, by naming the schooner after him, thus forcing the elder Mr. French to honor a maritime tradition which decreed that any living person with a vessel named for them must supply her with a set of flags.

Joseph W. French was her first master.  At first used in the coasting trade, she was operated as a fishing vessel between 1877 and 1888 before again returning to coasting.  In 1928 her masts were removed and she was converted to engine power, with a pilot house on her quarterdeck.  The ship remained in the coasting trade, carrying all manner of cargo, until 1973, when she was purchased by John Foss.  He spent three years restoring the vessel to her original sailing condition and outfitting her hold for passengers. Lewis R. French was among the first schooners sailing out of the North End Shipyard, owned by Foss, in Rockland, Maine as part of the "Maine Windjammer Fleet."

In 1986, Foss sold the schooner to his brother-in-law Dan Pease, who sailed and captained the Lewis R. French out of Rockland and then Camden until 2003.  That year, she was purchased from Pease by Garth Wells and now sails out of Camden. Garth Wells and his wife Jenny Tobin operated the schooner until April 2022, when they sold the business to Captain Becky Wright and Nathan Sigouin. Wright and Sigouin carry on windjamming with the French still in Camden.  Continuously since 1976, she has been in the tourist trade along the Maine coast.

Lewis R. French was listed on the National Register of Historic Places in 1991, and was designated a National Historic Landmark in 1992.  She is the oldest two-masted schooner in the United States (slightly older than Stephen Taber, also built in 1871), and is one of only two that has a full keel (the other, the Governor Stone, is also a National Historic Landmark).  She is the oldest sailing ship built in Maine, and the only known surviving Maine-built schooner that has always been home-ported in Maine.

See also

 List of National Historic Landmarks in Maine
 National Register of Historic Places listings in Knox County, Maine
 List of schooners
 List of oldest surviving ships

References

External links
Schooner Lewis R. French official site
Maine Windjammer Association official site

Ships on the National Register of Historic Places in Maine
National Historic Landmarks in Maine
Camden, Maine
Transportation buildings and structures in Knox County, Maine
Schooners of the United States
Tall ships of the United States
Windjammers
National Register of Historic Places in Knox County, Maine
1871 ships